Jakšić is a South Slavic surname. It may refer to:

Jakšić noble family
a family of the Drobnjaci clan
Đura Jakšić, Serbian artist
Đurađ Jakšić, Serbian politician
Jovana Jakšić, Serbian tennis player
Marko Jakšić (footballer, born 1983), Serbian footballer
Marko Jakšić (footballer, born 1987), Serbian footballer
Milovan Jakšić, Yugoslav footballer
Nenad Jakšić, Serbian footballer
Nikola Jakšić, Serbian water polo player

See also
Jaksici (disambiguation)

Serbian surnames
Croatian surnames